Team Scotland Roller Derby represents Scotland in women's international roller derby, in events such as the Roller Derby World Cup.  The team was first formed to compete at the 2011 Roller Derby World Cup, and finished the tournament in eleventh place.

Team Scotland played two warm-up matches for the World Cup, beating both a "rest of Scotland" team, and the "Northern All-Stars", consisting of skaters from the north of England.

At the World Cup, Scotland lost narrowly to New Zealand, 124 to 111, and overwhelmingly to Team USA, 435 to 1.  Although this led to the becoming the lowest-ranked team in the consolation stage, they beat Team Argentina and later beat Team Brazil, to finish eleventh out of thirteen teams.

Team roster

2011 team roster
About 45 skaters tried out for the initial team.  The roster was announced in August.
(league affiliations listed as of at the time of the announcement)

2014 team roster
The 2014 team was selected from a "Training Team" of 30 skaters, themselves selected via two rounds of tryouts performed under the auspices of the UK Roller Derby Association (UKRDA). The final 20 skaters selected for the 2014 World Cup roster were announced on 1 May 2014.

Since that announcement, Team Scotland have appeared in two public bouts, where many of the skaters skated under their legal names, rather than derby names (Team Scotland skaters choose themselves whether to use their legal or skate names for this squad): the below table lists skaters by the names they skate under with their home leagues. (league affiliations listed as of at the time of the announcement)

2018 team roster
The 2018 roster was announced on 2 March 2017, selected from amongst the training team of 30. There was a more even spread of talent from across Scotland and the UK this time around, and the team played their first public game against Team Ireland Roller Derby as part of the Euroclash 2017 tournament,  hosted by Newcastle Roller Derby. They achieved their best result in a world cup yet at the 2018 Roller Derby World Cup, coming in 12th place.

References

Scotland
Roller derby
Roller derby in Scotland
2011 establishments in Scotland
Sports clubs established in 2011